The following is an alphabetical list of topics related to Haiti.

0–9

.ht – Internet country code top-level domain for Haiti
 2010 Haiti earthquake

A
Adjacent country:

Administrative divisions of Haiti
Agriculture in Haiti
Air Force of Haiti
Americas
North America
North Atlantic Ocean
West Indies
Mer des Caraïbes (Caribbean Sea)
Antilles
Grandes Antilles (Greater Antilles)
Hispaniola
Antilles
Architecture of Haiti
Arijac, artist, painter
Army of Haiti
Arrondissements of Haiti
Atlantic Ocean
Atlas of Haiti

B

C
Cap-Haïtien
Capital of Haiti:  Ville de Port-au-Prince
Caribbean
Caribbean Community (CARICOM)
Caribbean Sea
Categories:
:Category:Haiti
:Category:Buildings and structures in Haiti
:Category:Communications in Haiti
:Category:Economy of Haiti
:Category:Education in Haiti
:Category:Environment of Haiti
:Category:Geography of Haiti
:Category:Government of Haiti
:Category:Haiti portal
:Category:Haiti stubs
:Category:Haitian culture
:Category:Haitian people
:Category:Haiti-related lists

:Category:Health in Haiti
:Category:History of Haiti
:Category:Military of Haiti
:Category:Politics of Haiti
:Category:Society of Haiti
:Category:Sport in Haiti
:Category:Transport in Haiti
commons:Category:Haiti
Cité Soleil
Coat of arms of Haiti
Communications in Haiti
Communes of Haiti
Constitution of Haiti
Cuisine of Haiti
Culture of Haiti

D
Demographics of Haiti
Departments of Haiti
Diplomatic missions of Haiti

E
Economy of Haiti
Education in Haiti
Elections in Haiti
Environment of Haiti
 Earthquake, 2010 see 2010 Haiti earthquake

F

Flag of Haiti
Foreign relations of Haiti
French America
French colonization of the Americas
French language

G
Geography of Haiti
Gonâve Microplate
Government of Haiti
Grandes Antilles
Greater Antilles

H
Haiti
"Haiti I Am Sorry"
Haiti Partnership
Haitian Creole language
Haitian cuisine
Haitian Revolution
Haitian Voodoo
Health care in Haiti
Hinduism in Haiti
Hispaniola
History of Haiti
Hospitals see List of hospitals in Haiti and Health care in Haiti
Human rights in Haiti
Human trafficking in Haiti

I
International Organization for Standardization (ISO)
ISO 3166-1 alpha-2 country code for Haiti: HT
ISO 3166-1 alpha-3 country code for Haiti: HTI
ISO 3166-2:HT region codes for Haiti
Internet in Haiti
Islam in Haiti
Islands of Haiti:
Western portion of the island of Hispaniola
Gonâve Island
Grande Cayemite
Île à Vache
Petite Cayemite
Tortuga

J

K

L
Languages of Haiti
Law enforcement in Haiti
LGBT rights in Haiti (Gay rights)
Lists related to Haiti:
Diplomatic missions of Haiti
List of airports in Haiti
List of birds of Haiti
List of cities in Haiti
List of companies of Haiti
List of countries by GDP (nominal)
List of diplomatic missions in Haiti
List of hospitals in Haiti
List of islands of Haiti
List of mountains of Haiti
List of national parks of Haiti
List of political parties in Haiti
List of rivers of Haiti
List of wettest tropical cyclones in Haiti
Topic outline of Haiti

M
Media in Haiti
Mer des Caraïbes
Military of Haiti
Morne Bois-Pin
Music of Haiti

N
National Assembly of Haiti
National Museum of Haiti
National Palace
North America
North Atlantic Ocean
Northern Hemisphere

O
Ottawa Initiative

P
Politics of Haiti
Port-au-Prince, Capital of Haiti
President of Haiti
Prime Minister of Haiti
Prostitution in Haiti
Public holidays in Haiti

Q

R
Rabies in Haiti
Rail transport in Haiti
Religion in Haiti
Republic of Haiti (French language: République d'Haïti;  Haitian Creole language: Repiblik Ayiti)

S
Saint-Domingue
Senate of Haiti
Sexual violence in Haiti
Slavery in Haiti

T
Timkatec
Topic outline of Haiti
Transport in Haiti
Tropical cyclones in Haiti

U
United Nations founding member state 1945
United Nations Stabilization Mission in Haiti
United States-Haiti relations
United States occupation of Haiti
University of Caraibe
University of Haiti
University Notre Dame of Haiti

V
Ville de Port-au-Prince – Capital of Haiti

W
Water supply and sanitation in Haiti
West Indies
Western Hemisphere

Wikipedia:WikiProject Topic outline/Drafts/Topic outline of Haiti

X

Y

Z

See also

List of Caribbean-related topics
List of international rankings
Lists of country-related topics
Topic outline of geography
Topic outline of Haiti
Topic outline of North America
United Nations

External links

 
Haiti